The 2016 Thailand Masters Grand Prix Gold was the third Grand Prix's badminton tournament of the 2016 BWF Grand Prix and Grand Prix Gold. It was the inaugural edition of the Thailand Masters. The tournament was held at the Nimibutr Stadium in Bangkok, Thailand on February 8–13, 2016 and had a total purse of $120,000.

Men's singles

Seeds

  Lee Hyun-il (champion)
  Son Wan-ho (semifinals)
  Hu Yun (final)
  Parupalli Kashyap (withdrawn)
  Wei Nan (quarterfinals)
  Ng Ka Long (quarterfinals)
  Marc Zwiebler (withdrawn)
  Lee Dong-keun (first round)
  Jeon Hyeok-jin (quarterfinals)
  Wong Wing Ki (first round)
  Boonsak Ponsana (third round)
  Tanongsak Saensomboonsuk (semifinals)
  Derek Wong Zi Liang (first round)
  Zulfadli Zulkiffli (third round)
  Sameer Verma (quarterfinals)
  Misha Zilberman (first round)

Finals

Top half

Section 1

Section 2

Section 3

Section 4

Bottom half

Section 5

Section 6

Section 7

Section 8

Women's singles

Seeds

  Saina Nehwal (withdrawn)
  Ratchanok Intanon (champion)
  Sung Ji-hyun (semifinals)
  Sun Yu (final)
  Bae Yeon-ju (second round)
  Busanan Ongbumrungpan (semifinals)
  Porntip Buranaprasertsuk (quarterfinals)
  Cheung Ngan Yi (first round)

Finals

Top half

Section 1

Section 2

Bottom half

Section 3

Section 4

Men's doubles

Seeds

  Mohammad Ahsan / Hendra Setiawan (champion)
  Kim Gi-jung / Kim Sa-rang (final)
  Ko Sung-hyun / Shin Baek-cheol (semifinals)
  Angga Pratama / Ricky Karanda Suwardi (withdrawn)
  Li Junhui / Liu Yuchen (quarterfinals)
  Goh V Shem / Tan Wee Kiong (quarterfinals)
  Markus Fernaldi Gideon / Kevin Sanjaya Sukamuljo (second round)
  Koo Kien Keat / Tan Boon Heong (quarterfinals)

Finals

Top half

Section 1

Section 2

Bottom half

Section 3

Section 4

Women's doubles

Seeds

  Chang Ye-na / Lee So-hee (second round)
  Jung Kyung-eun / Shin Seung-chan (semifinals)
  Tian Qing / Zhao Yunlei (champion)
  Vivian Hoo Kah Mun / Woon Khe Wei (semifinals)
  Tang Yuanting / Yu Yang (final)
  Go Ah-ra / Yoo Hae-won (quarterfinals)
  Gabriela Stoeva / Stefani Stoeva (first round)
  Amelia Alicia Anscelly / Soong Fie Cho (first round)

Finals

Top half

Section 1

Section 2

Bottom half

Section 3

Section 4

Mixed doubles

Seeds

  Ko Sung-hyun / Kim Ha-na (quarterfinals)
  Praveen Jordan / Debby Susanto (first round)
  Lee Chun Hei / Chau Hoi Wah (semifinals)
  Shin Baek-Cheol / Chae Yoo-jung (first round)
  Choi Sol-gyu / Eom Hye-won (first round)
  Edi Subaktiar / Gloria Emanuelle Widjaja (first round)
  Chan Peng Soon / Goh Liu Ying (final)
  Michael Fuchs / Birgit Michels (second round)

Finals

Top half

Section 1

Section 2

Bottom half

Section 3

Section 4

References

External links 
 Tournament Link

Thailand Masters
Thailand Masters Grand Prix Gold
Badminton, Grand Prix Gold, Thailand Masters
Badminton, Grand Prix Gold, Thailand Masters
Thailand Masters (badminton)
Badminton, Grand Prix Gold, Thailand Masters